Henry Rich may refer to:

Henry Rich, 1st Earl of Holland (1590–1649), English courtier, peer and soldier
Sir Henry Rich, 1st Baronet (1803–1869), Liberal politician
Henry Bayard Rich (1849–1884), British soldier and football player

See also
Frederick Henry Rich (1824–1904), British soldier and Chief Inspecting Officer of the Railway Inspectorate